Frederick Arthur Bagg (1871 - March 1, 1932) was the engineer who surveyed the route for the New York State Canal System. He was the chief engineer for the Johnstown, Fonda, and Gloverville Railroad.

Biography
He was born in 1871 in Providence, Rhode Island.  He attended the Rensselaer Polytechnic Institute.  He  was married to Edith Cress.

He surveyed the route for the New York State Canal System.  He was the chief engineer for the Johnstown, Fonda, and Gloverville Railroad.

He then worked for the New York Central Railroad till his death on March 1, 1932, in Millburn, New Jersey. He died of heart disease.

References

Rensselaer Polytechnic Institute alumni
1871 births
1932 deaths
People from Providence, Rhode Island
19th-century American engineers
American canal engineers
American railway civil engineers
20th-century American engineers